William Parker (probably born in the 18th century–1817) was a British glassmaker and inventor.

Based in London, William Parker gained renown for his glass cutting and manufacturing. The foremost chandelier manufacturer of the late 18th century, he provided aristocratic, noble, and royal houses with fine glass chandeliers. Parker also specialized in manufacturing glass for scientific instruments: William Parker and Son, of Fleet Street, London, supplied British chemist Joseph Priestley with lenses and bell jars for many of his experiments, and continued to do so after Priestley’s move to America.

In 1784, William Parker sent the American Philosophical Society a large burning lens device which could focus the sun's rays, thereby melting or fusing various substances. One year later, he was elected as a member to the society.

References

Members of the American Philosophical Society
British inventors
18th-century births
1817 deaths
Year of birth unknown